The 86th season of the Campeonato Gaúcho kicked off on January 11, 2006 and ended on April 9, 2006. Eighteen teams participated. Holders Internacional lost to Grêmio in the finals, with the latter winning its 34th title. Farroupilha and Passo Fundo were relegated.

Participating teams

System 
The championship would have four stages:

 First stage: The 18 teams were divided into three groups of six teams each. They played against each other inside their groups in a double round-robin system. After 10 rounds, the top two teams of each group, plus the two best third-placed teams qualified to the Semifinals.
 Copa Emílio Perondi: The ten eliminated teams were divided into 2 groups of five teams each. They played against each other inside their groups in a double round-robin system. After 10 rounds, the group winners would qualify into the Finals, with the winner qualifying to the Série C of that year, and the bottom team in each group being relegated.
 Semifinals: The eight remaining teams were divided in 2 groups of 4 teams each and they played in a double round-robin system. The winner of each group qualified to the Finals.
 Finals: Semifinals group winners played in two matches to define the Champions. The team with best overall record played the second leg at home.

Championship

First stage

Group 1

Group 2

Group 3

Copa Emílio Perondi

Group 1

Group 2

Finals

Semifinals

Group 1

Group 2

Finals

References 

Campeonato Gaúcho seasons
Gaúcho